Mark Edward Brennan (born February 6, 1947) is an American prelate of the Roman Catholic Church who is bishop of the Diocese of Wheeling-Charleston in West Virginia. He was installed on August 22, 2019.  Brennan previously served as an auxiliary bishop of the Archdiocese of Baltimore in Maryland from 2017 to 2019.

Biography

Early years 
Mark Brennan was born on February 6, 1947, in Boston, Massachusetts. He attended public elementary and junior high schools before attending St. Anthony Catholic School in Washington, D.C. He received a Bachelor of History degree in 1969 from Brown University in Providence, Rhode Island.

After receiving his bachelor's degree, Brennan completed one year of philosophy studies at Christ the King Seminary in New York before attending the Pontifical North American College in Rome.  He earned a Bachelor of Sacred Theology degree in 1973 and a Master of Theology degree from the Pontifical Gregorian University in Rome. Brennan was ordained to the diaconate May 10, 1973, in Rome.

Brennan served diaconal assignments at Our Lady Queen of Peace Parish in Washington in the summer of 1973; St. Aloysius Parish in Leonardtown, Maryland, from 1974 to 1975; and St. John Parish in Clinton, Maryland, from 1975 to 1976.

Priestly ministry 
Brennan was ordained to the priesthood for the Archdiocese of Washington by Archbishop William W. Baum on May 15, 1976. His clergy assignments in the archdiocese included the following:

 Pastor, St. Martin of Tours Parish, Gaithersburg, Maryland (2003–2016)
 Pastor, St. Thomas the Apostle Parish, Washington, DC (1998–2003)
 Director of priestly vocations (1988–1998)
 Parochial vicar, St. Bartholomew Parish, Bethesda, Maryland (1986–1988)
 Spanish language and cultural studies in Dominican Republic and Colombia (1985–1986)
 Parochial vicar, St. Pius X Parish, Bowie, Maryland (1981–1985)
 Parochial vicar, Our Lady of Mercy Parish, Potomac, Maryland (1976–1981)

Auxiliary Bishop of Baltimore 

Pope Francis appointed Brennan as auxiliary bishop for the Archdiocese of Baltimore and titular Bishop of Rusibisir on December 5, 2016. He was consecrated by Archbishop William E. Lori on January 19, 2017.

Bishop of Wheeling-Charleston 
On July 23, 2019, Pope Francis named Brennan as bishop of the Diocese of Wheeling-Charleston, to succeed Bishop Michael J. Bransfield,  Bransfield had retired in 2018, having received Vatican sanctions "for financial crimes and sexual harassment". Brennan was installed at Wheeling's Cathedral of Saint Joseph on August 22, 2019. Asked in 2019 to comment about Bransfield's personal spending using church funds, Brennan said:Self-indulgence by a bishop, a pastor or anybody else by the Church is just not right. That’s the people’s money. We’re supposed to use the resources people give for the good of the mission of the Church. That’s the point of collecting all of these funds. We’re not supposed to be using the resource of the Church for self-indulgent purposes, and that can take many different forms.On November 26, 2019, at the request of Pope Francis, Brennan submitted a plan of amends to Bransfield that called for the repayment of $792,000 to the diocese. Bransfield had previously failed to submit his own plan of amends to the Vatican. In August 2020, the diocese settled a lawsuit brought by several men who had accused Bransfield of sexual assaulting them.  The details of the settlement were not released.

See also

 Catholic Church hierarchy
 Catholic Church in the United States
 Historical list of the Catholic bishops of the United States
 List of Catholic bishops of the United States
 Lists of patriarchs, archbishops, and bishops

References

External links
 Roman Catholic Diocese of Wheeling–Charleston 
 Roman Catholic Archdiocese of Baltimore

 
 

1947 births
Living people
Roman Catholic clergy from Boston
21st-century Roman Catholic bishops in the United States
Bishops appointed by Pope Francis
Pontifical North American College alumni
Pontifical Gregorian University alumni
Brown University alumni